Holding hands is a form of physical intimacy involving two or more people. It may or may not be romantic.

Cultural aspects

In Western culture, spouses and romantic couples often hold hands as a sign of affection or to express psychological closeness. Non-romantic friends may also hold hands, although acceptance of this varies by culture and gender role. Parents or guardians may hold the hands of small children to exercise guidance or authority. In terms of romance, handholding is often used in the early stages of dating or courtship to express romantic interest in a partner. Handholding is also common in advanced stages of a romantic relationship where it may be used to signify or seek solace and reassurance.

Same-sex couples may avoid holding hands in public due to homophobia. In 2012, an average of 74% of gay men and 51% of lesbian women responded to an EU Fundamental Rights Agency survey saying they avoid holding hands in public for fear of harassment or assault. These responses varied from 45% to 89% depending on country, with an average of 66%.

In Arab countries, North Africa, some parts of Asia and traditionally in some Mediterranean and Southern European cultures (especially in Sicily), males also hold hands for friendship and as a sign of respect; a custom which is especially noticed by societies unused to it, for instance when, in 2005, Crown Prince Abdullah of Saudi Arabia held hands with the United States President George W. Bush.

Physical and psychological aspects
According to Tiffany Field, the director of the Touch Research Institute, holding hands stimulates the vagus nerve, which decreases blood pressure and heart rate and puts people in a more relaxed state.

See also
 Public display of affection
 Human chain

References

External links 
 

Human communication
Hand